Mouloud Belatrèche (born 10 March 1976 in Médéa) is an Algerian professional footballer. He currently plays as a midfielder for the Algerian Ligue 2 club CA Bordj Bou Arreridj.

Club career

Olympique de Médéa
Belatrèche signed in the summer of 2010 for Olympique de Médéa for his second stint at his home town club from JSM Béjaïa. On 17 December 2010, he scored his first goal since his return to his home-town club in the eighty-first minute against NA Hussein Dey. He was then sent off in the eighty-fifth minute.

Statistics

References

External links
Mouloud Belatreche profile at dzfoot.com

1976 births
Living people
People from Médéa
Algerian footballers
Olympique de Médéa players
Algerian Ligue 2 players
JSM Béjaïa players
USM Blida players
RC Kouba players
CA Bordj Bou Arréridj players
Association football midfielders
21st-century Algerian people